The Solomon Neill Brooks House, near Shepherdsville, Kentucky, was built in 1847.  It was listed on the National Register of Historic Places in 1980.

It is a two-story, five-bay brick Greek Revival house with a central passage plan.

Three contemporary outbuildings are included in the listing.

References

Houses on the National Register of Historic Places in Kentucky
Greek Revival architecture in Kentucky
Houses completed in 1847
National Register of Historic Places in Bullitt County, Kentucky
1847 establishments in Kentucky
Central-passage houses
Houses in Bullitt County, Kentucky